Barnet Synagogue is located in Eversleigh Road, New Barnet, in the London Borough of Barnet.

References

Synagogues in London